is a Japanese animated franchise about a five-member superhero ninja team created by Tatsuo Yoshida and produced by Tatsunoko Productions. The original anime series, which debuted in 1972, was eponymously entitled Kagaku Ninja-tai Gatchaman and is best known in the English-speaking world as the adaptation entitled Battle of the Planets (1978). The series had additional English adaptations with G-Force: Guardians of Space (1986) and ADV Films' uncut 2005 release. Tatsunoko also uses the official translation Science Commando Gatchaman in related products and media.

The original Kagaku Ninja-tai Gatchaman series was followed by an animated film and two direct sequel series, Gatchaman II (1978) and Gatchaman Fighter (1979). During the 1990s, episodes from both series were dubbed into English by Saban as Eagle Riders.

In the years since, the franchise has spawned many different productions, some that were left unproduced or evolved significantly from its development. This includes a 1994 original animated video remake, an unproduced 1998 television remake, a cancelled 2011 animated film reboot by Imagi Animation Studios, a 2013 Japanese live-action film reboot by Nikkatsu Studios, various spinoffs, re-imaginings, and merchandise.

Original series

Plot
Recurring themes of Gatchaman involve conservation, environmentalism and the responsible use of technology for progress. The series centers around five young superhero ninja employed by Kōzaburō Nambu of the fictitious International Science Organization to oppose an international terrorist organization of technologically advanced villains (Galactor) who are trying to control Earth's natural resources, such as water, oil, sugar and uranium. The leader of Galactor is an androgynous, masked antagonist named Berg Katse, who is later revealed to be a shape-shifting mutant acting on the orders of an alien superior (Leader X). Their mechas are often animal-based.

Most of the team are in their late teens, except for Jinpei (who is about ten or eleven years old). They include Ken Washio, the team leader and tactical expert; Jō Asakura, his second-in-command marksman and weapons expert; Jun, the team's electronics and demolitions expert; Jinpei, the youngest and the reconnaissance expert as well as an adopted brother of Jun; and Ryū Nakanishi, the ship's pilot. The main characters wear teen clothing with T-shirts numbered to show their rank in the team or caped, birdlike battle uniforms. The Science Ninja Team is often aided by a squadron of combat pilots led by the enigmatic Red Impulse, who is later revealed as Ken's father.

The Gatchaman team employs a unique and effective martial art developed by Dr. Nambu, drawing on their ability to perform feats similar to their avian namesakes, such as high-speed running, flight, high jumping, and silent attacks. The team members also use signature weapons and mecha-style vehicles, each with a mundane, disguised form. To change modes, each member is equipped with a wrist device that, in addition to communications and tracking, enables a change when the proper gesture and voice command ("Bird, go!") is given.

Their vehicles are docked in the team's main vehicle: the God Phoenix, a supersonic plane capable of underwater travel and space flight. The God Phoenix is armed with Bird Missiles, which are fired from a rack mounted atop the center section. After the original God Phoenix is destroyed by an octopus mecha, an improved version carries a pair of Super Bird Missiles in twin drop-down pods on the bottom center section. The ship also has an energy-beam weapon that opens the nose doors for the weapon apparatus mounted on the frame holding Joe's car; however, its solar power source is unreliable because of its sensitivity to cloud cover. The plane can also temporarily transform into a massive bird of flame (like the legendary phoenix) to escape danger or attack, although the process endangers the team because of extreme pressure in the passenger cabin and it consumes a great deal of fuel.

Characters

Episodes

Production
Created in the wake of the Henshin (transformation) boom begun by Shotaro Ishinomori's Kamen Rider in 1971, Gatchaman was conceived as a blending of ninja adventure with science fiction. It was one of the most successful anime attempts to emulate the American superhero genre, with many of its conventions (such as colorful costumes).

Film version

In 1978, Tatsunoko released a condensed theatrical compilation of the first two-story arcs in the series with additional new animation.

The film was released in English for the first time by Sentai Filmworks in 2015. The dub featured the cast reprising their roles from the ADV dub of the original TV anime for the film.

Adaptations
After its broadcast in Japan, Gatchaman was later exported to other countries and translated into several languages. In Taiwan, beginning in 1977 it was known as Ke Xue Xiao Fei Xia (/ kēxué xiǎofēixiá, Scientific Flying Fantasy Warriors).

The original series has seen several English adaptations with varying levels of modifications. Many of these versions later spawned foreign-language releases of their own:

Battle of the Planets

Sandy Frank and Jameson Brewer syndicated the series on American television in 1978, in heavily edited form, as Battle of the Planets (BOTP). Several scenes were replaced with new segments by Gallerie International Films, with additional characters: 7-Zark-7 and his associates, 1-Rover-1 (a robot dog) and Susan, in a number of space outposts. Other segments included the Phoenix flying in space. The quality of the new segments did not match the original content, with the G-Force and 7-Zark-7 appearing together. New music by Hoyt Curtin was blended with the original soundtrack. Although all 105 episodes were used as sources, 85 sporadic episodes were released. An animated TV movie was made, combining several episodes into a new storyline. In 2003, Sandy Frank announced a series of eight compilation films that ultimately went unreleased.

Battle of the Planets was released on VHS and DVD from 2001 to 2003 by Rhino Entertainment in six volumes and a complete DVD collection. The DVDs included a subtitled version of the corresponding Japanese episodes, alongside a single episode of the later English adaptation, G-Force. When Sentai Filmworks acquired the rights to Gatchaman in 2014, Battle of the Planets became available to stream on The Anime Network and temporarily on Hulu.

Battle of the Planets: Phoenix Ninjas
Battle of the Planets: Phoenix Ninjas is a scrapped reboot of the first American adaptation of Science Ninja Team Gatchaman. Tatsunoko partnered up with d-rights and Nelvana, a Canadian animation company owned by Corus Entertainment, on the project. The last new information on the project was in 2016 and it appears to be canceled.

G-Force: Guardians of Space

With Battle of the Planets ending its syndicated run and broadcast standards becoming laxer, a second English translation from Turner Program Services and Fred Ladd, by license of Sandy Frank, was produced. Entitled G-Force: Guardians of Space, this adaptation consisted of 85 episodes, spanning episodes 1–87 but skipping episodes 81 and 86. The series aired internationally beginning in 1987, but would not air in its entirety in the U.S until its run on Cartoon Network in 1995 & Air on toonami's midnight run in 2000. Although this version was less heavily edited and had a relatively faithful translation, the voice acting, background music and the Americanized character names were criticized.

A single episode from G-Force was included as a bonus on Rhino's individual Battle of the Planets DVDs released through 2001 and 2003. Seven more episodes were released in a 2004 best-of collection, making 13 out of the show's 85 episodes available on disc.

Battle of the Planets: The New Exploits of G-Force
Development began for an uncensored version of Battle of the Planets. An animated TV movie was made (Battle of the Planets: The Movie, featuring David Bret Edgen as Zark), combining several episodes into a new storyline. In 2003, Sandy Frank announced a series of 8 compilation films that ultimately went unreleased. 
Sandy Frank announced a third English adaptation of the series in 2003 that was also never released. Battle of the Planets: The New Exploits of G-Force was set to be a 52-episode series encompassing content from the first 85 episodes of Gatchaman, the 20 previously unlocalized ones, and new CG animation produced by JulesWorld (including 7-Zark-7). The series would have been recorded at Ocean Studios in Vancouver, Canada and would have featured a new score and script to help modernize the show and create a tone in-between the two prior adaptations. While never released, the twenty-second episode of Gatchaman was adapted into a pilot called The Sea Dragon. It received two forms: one that focused on adventure and action and another that focused on comedy. At the time, this rendition of the show was sold as Battle of the Planets: The New Adventures of G-Force.

DVD releases
At Anime Central 2004, ADV Films announced that it had acquired the rights to release the series. From 2005–2006, the company released 18 volumes (and nine limited-edition sets) containing a new uncut English dub recorded in Texas and Japanese audio with English subtitles under the name Gatchaman. This release included all 105 episodes. The dub aimed to be a faithful translation, without attempts to modify the show for younger viewers (including profanity and the word "kill"). The English dub contained creative changes: profanity, 1970s slang and thick, occasionally stereotypical accents were added. in 2012 the Series was released on Blu ray & dvd in Japan on October 19,2012. 

In 2007 Sandy Frank's long-term contract with Tatsunoko Productions (owners of the Gatchaman franchise), which gave it all domestic U.S rights to the first Gatchaman series and its English adaptations, lapsed and all video releases went out of print. Sentai Filmworks, a company founded by the creators of ADV, later signed a contract with Tatsunoko, acquiring the North American home video rights to the Gatchaman franchise in 2013. Section23 Films released a complete collection of the series on DVD and Blu-ray on December 10, 2013. The Blu-ray set contains 14 discs in three keep cases, and the DVD set has 22 discs in four cases. Both sets contain all 105 episodes of the original series (with the ADV Films English version and Japanese audio).

Other anime series

Gatchaman II

A sequel, filmed with a different color process, was released four years later. Resembling the Blue Hawk, the new God Phoenix is larger and painted with the face of a bird. The personal mecha are also upgraded, with similar bird-designed paint jobs. Ryu has a tank-like mecha and a Pilot Machine to assist him.

Gatchaman II sees Sosai X turn a young shipwreck survivor into his newest commander Gel Sadoma and resumes his plot to destroy the Earth. Gatchaman reunites with Joe, now a cyborg, after Galactor sends a spy to serve as his replacement on the team. The group is also aided by Dr. Pandora, who is revealed to be Gel Sadoma's mother.

In the end, Sosai X is destroyed by Joe and Gel Sadoma dies after betraying Sosai X, after the villain murders her mother.

Episodes from this series and Gatchaman Fighter were combined and translated into English as Eagle Riders in 1996 by Saban Entertainment. Gatchaman II served as the bulk of the series, though its ending is changed to have Gel Sadora turn into Gatchaman Fighter villain Egoblauser.

Another release in South Korea is Eagle 5 Brothers (독수리 5 형제, Dokksuri Hyeongje) which does not contain unusual changes in audio. Instead, it contains visual changes.

Gatchaman Fighter

This series aired in 1979, immediately after Gatchaman II. Here, the team's mecha bear no resemblance to birds. Earth is again threatened by evil; the mad tyrant Egoblauser (who has usurped control over the shattered forces of Galactor) and Sosai X, who has been reborn as Sosai Z.

Unlike Gatchaman II, Gatchaman Fighter is a much darker series, especially in the final episodes with regards to casualties and deaths of longtime series characters. The ending itself has Gatchaman presumed dead, sacrificing their lives to destroy Sosai X once and for all.

Select episodes from this series and Gatchaman II were combined and translated into English as Eagle Riders in 1996 by Saban Entertainment.

Gatchaman (OVA)

A 1994 original video animation remake series produced in association with Artmic that featured updated character designs and altered backgrounds.

Urban Vision released it on VHS in 1997 and DVD in 2001 with an English dub produced by Harmony Gold and Japanese audio with English subtitles. In 2013, Sentai Filmworks licensed the series and produced a new English dub from Seraphim Digital with the same cast as their ADV/Sentai's releases of the original series and film. The new dub was released on DVD and Blu-Ray and is available for streaming on The Anime Network.

New Gatchaman
 is a project that was attempted around the same time that  Mach Go Go Go '97 was made. This version of Speed Racer was not so successful and as a result, it was canceled along with the project of Gatchaman '98.

NTT/SMAP Gatchaman

NTT Gatchaman was a series of commercials that were made to promote the Internet service provider NTT-East in fall 2000. Some of the commercials featured Japanese boy band group SMAP portraying live action versions of the characters, while the other two were animated by Tatsunoko Production and featured modernized costume redesigns of the Science Ninja Team. The animated commercials were directed by Keiichi Sato, with character designs by Kenji Hayama. A light novel based on these commercials were sent by e-mail by NTT-East as a gift for new subscribers. To this date, the contents of this light novel remain unknown. 
Based on sketches found on the Internet, fans have speculated if the commercials were an attempt to revive the franchise with a new anime. However,  no such series was made at that time, and the franchise would not receive any new animated material for thirteen years until Gatchaman Crowds.

Good Morning Ninja Team Gatchaman

In 2011, Tatsunoko produced a series of 200 two-minute flash animated shorts called  for broadcast on NTV's Zip! television series. While the series used the original's designs, it was more comedic in nature and featured none of the original actors. The characters were instead voiced by Scha Dara Parr's Bose and Ani, along with actor Tomu Miyazaki.

Additional shorts were produced in promotion of the Japanese launch of Monster Hunter 3 Ultimate.

Gatchaman Crowds

A reboot of the Gatchaman series premiered in July 2013 on NTV. The story is set in Tachikawa City, Tokyo, where some of its residents have been chosen to join a team to confront a mysterious entity known as MESS. The series follows Hajime Ichinose, a 16-year-old girl who is the team's newest member. A second season, titled Gatchaman Crowds insight, started airing on July 6, 2015.

As it aired in Japan, both seasons of the show were simulcast on Crunchyroll. Sentai Filmworks licensed and dubbed both seasons. They released them on home video between 2014 and 2016.

Crossovers

Ken the Eagle ,Jun the swan and other Tatsunoko superheroes with their first crossover game for the playstation Video game Tatsunoko Fight developed by Takara released in 2000.

The 26-episode anime series ran on Yomiuri TV between from October 4, 2010 and March 28, 2011.

On March 26, 2016, Tatsunoko announced a collaboration with Digital Frontier to create the Infini-T Force 3D CGI anime project. The team features members from Gatchaman alongside Tekkaman, Casshan and Hurricane Polymar. Set for release in 2017 alongside Tatsunoko's 55th anniversary, the project will contain an original story and will not be an adaptation of Ukyō Kodachi and Tatsuma Ejiri's  manga series.

Film adaptations

Canceled Imagi film
Imagi began developing a film version in 2004, with producer Tom Gray saying that it would have a PG-13 or R rating. A Gatchaman film was first announced in February 2006, with an expected 2008 release.  Kevin Munroe (TMNT) was scheduled to write and direct, with Lynne Southerland (co-director of Mulan 2) as producer, and an initial treatment was begun. However, in 2008 Munroe was taken off the project to direct Dylan Dog. Although early scripts were written by Paul Dini, in fall 2007 he was released from the project. In June 2007, Robert Mark Kamen was signed to write the screenplay in preparation for a 2008 release.

At the July 2008 Comic-Con, Imagi introduced a Paul Dini-scripted trailer. In August, art director Felix Ip began posting screenshots from the trailer. At the July 2009 Anime Expo, Imagi shared another 45-second, Dini-scripted trailer. Although it did not reveal much plot, it was the first public look at the 3D characterizations of the main villain Galactor and the Gatchaman team in and out of costume. The trailer also introduced the film's theme: "A world in chaos, an alien evil, a lone warrior is found; Earth's last hope, five shall rise, Gatchaman." In July 2010 Imagi posted a new one-minute trailer for Gatchaman on its company website, with a release date of 2011.

In December 2009, auditors reported growing concerns with the half-year results posted by Imagi. Although the company said that it was on course for the release of Astro Boy, according to the audit firm "It is uncertain whether the group will have the necessary financial resources to complete [the films] Gatchaman, Tusker, and Cat Tale."  In January 2009 the auditing firm announced that the studio lacked funding for the release of Tusker, Cat Tale and Gatchaman,  although Felix Ip reported that Gatchaman was expected to be released later in 2009. In June 2009, Imagi opened Gatchaman for licensing and announced a planned 3-D theatrical release in 2011. On December 11, 2009 Imagi's Hong Kong-based parent company, Imagi International Holdings Limited, laid off 100 employees. In January 2010 it announced that although the Gatchaman project would be delivered in 100-percent stereoscopic 3D, to safeguard working capital it would close its U.S. subsidiaries. The U.S. closure was finalized in late January, with about 30 staffers laid off and a few key personnel continuing as consultants as Imagi sought $30 million from investors for its animation projects. In February 2010 the parent company laid off another 300 employees, calling the layoffs temporary as it sought new investors. On June 21, 2011, Imagi announced in its annual report that the Gatchaman film project was cancelled.

Nikkatsu film

Nikkatsu Studios produced a live-action version of Gatchaman for Japan, which was released in August 2013.

American live-action film
It was announced at the San Diego Comic Con in July 2019 that Joe and Anthony Russo are producing a live-action Battle of the Planets film through their production company, AGBO Studios with the possibility of directing.

Character variations

Team variations in different versions

Other character variations in different versions

Other changes

‡The original Japanese-language version of Gatchaman features a few words in English.

Video games

Ken, Jun and Berg appear as playable characters in Tatsunoko Fight. Ken and Jun appear as playable fighters in Tatsunoko vs. Capcom: Cross Generation of Heroes, and Joe joins Ken and Jun in Tatsunoko vs. Capcom: Ultimate All-Stars.

Reception

In 2001, the Japanese magazine Animage listed the 1972 Gatchaman TV series the 10th-best anime production of all time.

Legacy

Impact
Gatchaman helped establish the convention of the five-member hero team emulated in later series, notably in the successful tokusatsu Super Sentai franchise (a genre exemplified by the English series adaptation of the Power Rangers franchise many years later). The Sentai series Chōjin Sentai Jetman was, in many ways, a homage to Gatchaman.

Guest appearances and pop culture references

 The Italian cartoon Winx Club parodied Gatchaman in the episode "Battle on Planet Eraklyon" when several characters form the superhero quintet "Patchamen," with uniforms and mannerisms bearing striking resemblances to those of the Science Ninja Team.
In 1994, the Science Ninja Team and Dr. Nambu appeared in a crossover OVA, Time Bokan: Royal Revival.
In 2000, NTT East produced two animated and two live-action television commercials for their ISDN service with an updated version of Gatchaman, featuring members of the J-Pop boy group SMAP.
They appeared in several episodes of the 2008 reboot of Yatterman as background characters and played a minor speaking role in the hour-long "Episode 12.5" TV special.
The third episode of Sket Dance has Jun as a playable character in a re-enactment of Tatsunoko vs. Capcom. 
The face of one of the characters appears in episode 252 of the Gin Tama anime. 
Archie's Sonic the Hedgehog comic series parodied Gatchaman in Sonic Super Special issue #12. 
A parody of Gatchaman was used in the cartoon Megas XLR as the S-Force, appearing in two episodes. 
Joe is the reference of the Yu-Gi-Oh! TCG card, "Swift Birdman Joe".
The character Ushiwaka in the Clover Studios video game Ōkami wears a hood that resembles that of the Gatchaman cast members.
The Ame-Comi version of Batgirl has a costume with design similarities to the Gatchaman costume. She is also equipped with Batarangs that look identical to Ken the Eagle's Birdrangs.
The character of Lord Viper in the 90s cartoon King Arthur and the Knights of Justice appears to be based on the design of Spectra foot soldiers.

References

External links

1972 anime television series debuts
ADV Films
Japanese children's animated action television series
Japanese children's animated space adventure television series
Japanese children's animated science fiction television series
Japanese children's animated superhero television series
Anime with original screenplays
Fuji TV original programming
Gatchaman
Mecha anime and manga
Ninja in anime and manga
Sentai Filmworks
Superheroes in anime and manga
Tatsunoko Production franchises